Hugh MacDonald (born 1945) is a Canadian poet and children's writer and editor who lives in Montague, Prince Edward Island. Among his many awards are the L.M. Montgomery Children's Literature Award, 1990 and the 2004 Award for Distinguished Contribution to the Literary Arts on Prince Edward Island. He was appointed Poet Laureate for Prince Edward Island effective 1 January 2010 by the provincial legislature for a period of three years.

Works 
 Chung Lee Loves Lobsters – 1992
 Looking for Mother – 1995
The Digging of Deep Wells – 1997
Tossed Like Weeds from the Garden – 1999
Landmarks: An Anthology of New Atlantic Canadian Poetry of the Land ed. with Brent MacLaine – 2001
A Bountiful Harvest: 15 Years of the Island Literary Awards – 2002
Cold Against the Heart – 2003
Letting Go: An Anthology of Loss and Survival – 2005
Murder at Mussel Cove – 2005
Crosby and Me – 2010
Chung Lee Loves Lobsters – 2011
This is a Love Song – 2011
I is for Island: A Prince Edward Island Alphabet – 2012
The Last Wild Boy – 2013
Morgan's Boat Ride −2014
''And All The Stars Shall fall,,-2017

References 

1945 births
Canadian children's writers
20th-century Canadian poets
20th-century Canadian male writers
Canadian male poets
Living people
Poets Laureate of places in Canada